Kneser is a surname. Notable people with the surname include:

Adolf Kneser (1862–1930), mathematician
Hellmuth Kneser (1898–1973), mathematician, son of Adolf Kneser
Martin Kneser (1928–2004), mathematician, son of Hellmuth Kneser